Sarıyer Spor Kulübü or Sarıyer S.K. is a Turkish sports club located in Sarıyer, Istanbul. The football team plays in the TFF Second League. Sarıyer won the Balkans Cup in 1991–92 season against Romanian club Oțelul Galați with results: 0–0 away and 1–0 after extra time at home.

League attendances
 Turkish Super League: 1982–94, 1996–97
 TFF First League: 1963–69, 1971–82, 1994–96, 1997–01, 2004–05
 TFF Second League: 1969–71, 2001–04, 2005–

Honours
 Balkans Cup
 Winners (1): 1991–92

European participations

Statistics:

Pld = Matches played; W = Matches won; D = Matches drawn; L = Matches lost; GF = Goals for; GA = Goals against; GD = Goal Difference. 

Balkans Cup:

Current squad

Other players under contract

References

External links
Official website
Sarıyer on TFF.org

 
Association football clubs established in 1940
1940 establishments in Turkey
Süper Lig clubs
Turkish football clubs in international competitions